Blairgowrie is a seaside town on the Mornington Peninsula in Melbourne, Victoria, Australia, approximately  south of Melbourne's central business district, located within the Shire of Mornington Peninsula local government area. Blairgowrie recorded population of 2,786 at the 2021 census.

History

Blairgowrie was named after the Burgh of Blairgowrie, the largest town in Perth and Kinross, Scotland. A post office was not opened until 1 November 1947.

Rhys Isaac, Pulitzer Prize-winning historian, died in Blairgowrie in October 2010.

Present day

Blairgowrie is located near the western tip of the Mornington Peninsula, between Sorrento and Rye, and is one of many popular holiday destinations for Melburnians along this narrow peninsula strip. It is bordered on the north by Port Phillip, and on the south by Bass Strait and a series of surf beaches interspersed with spectacular cliffs and rocky ledges. It is frequented by tourists in the summer months, and has been featured on numerous travel programs.

Blairgowrie Pier is the most popular shore dive site for recreational scuba diving inside Port Phillip. It was built as a safe boat harbour and marina by the Blairgowrie Yacht Squadron. Blairgowrie Pier is highly regarded for the more than a hundred different species of nudibranch that have been identified there. Each year from May through July thousands of spider crabs migrate along the ocean floor to the cool, shallow waters around Blairgowrie Pier. When the water temperature drops, the spider crabs moult their shells. While their new shells harden, they crowd together for protection from predators like stingrays, seals and sharks, sometimes forming stacks more than a metre high. There are also octopus, cuttlefish, seahorses, box fish, large stingrays, decorator crabs, stargazers, invertebrate, goat fish, blennies, and much colour underwater at Blairgowrie Pier.

See also
 Shire of Flinders – Blairgowrie was previously within this former local government area.

References

External links
 

Suburbs of Melbourne
Suburbs of the Shire of Mornington Peninsula
Coastal towns in Victoria (Australia)